Pak Hok Shan is a small hill in the northern part of the New Kowloon in Hong Kong. The Hong Kong Chinese Christian Churches Union Cemetery is located on this hill.

History 
The hill was the site of a mine on the Kowloon Peninsula, as mining was a booming industry in the area in the 19th century. The walls of Kowloon Walled City were partly made from stones extracted from this hill.

See also 
 Geography of Hong Kong
 List of mountains, peaks and hills in Hong Kong
 Lion Rock
 Kai Tak Airport

References 

Wong Tai Sin District